François Vendasi (24 June 1940 – 21 November 2022) was a French politician who was a member of the Senate, representing the Haute-Corse department. He was a member of the Radical Party of the Left. Vendasi died on 21 November 2022, at the age of 82.

References

Sources
Page on the Senate website 

1940 births
2022 deaths
Place of birth missing
Corsican politicians
French Senators of the Fifth Republic
Radical Party of the Left politicians
Senators of Haute-Corse